The 2015–16 Utah Valley Wolverines men's basketball team represented Utah Valley University in the 2015–16 NCAA Division I men's basketball season. This was the first year under head coach Mark Pope. They played their home games at the UCCU Center and were member of the Western Athletic Conference. They finished the season 12–18, 6–8 in WAC play to finish in fifth place. They lost in the quarterfinals of the WAC tournament to UMKC.

Previous season 
The Wolverines finished the season 11–19, 5–9 in WAC play to finish sixth in the WAC. They lost in the WAC Quarterfinals to UMKC to end their season. The season would be Dick Hunsaker's final season at Utah Valley as he chose to retire at the end of the season.

Departures

Incoming transfers

Recruiting class of 2015

Roster

Radio broadcasts and streams
All Wolverines games will air on KOVO, AKA ESPN 960 Sports. Games will be streamed online through ESPN 960's webpage as well as at Utah Valley's Stretch Internet feed.

Schedule and results

|-
!colspan=9 style="background:#006633; color:#CFB53B;"| Exhibition

|-
!colspan=9 style="background:#006633; color:#CFB53B;"| Non-conference regular season

|-
!colspan=9 style="background:#006633; color:#CFB53B;"| WAC regular season

|-
!colspan=9 style="background:#006633; color:#CFB53B;"| WAC tournament

References

Utah Valley Wolverines men's basketball seasons
Utah Valley